The 2014 South Korean Figure Skating Championships was the South Korean Figure Skating Championships for the 2013-2014 season. It was the 68th edition of those championships held. It was organized by the Korean Skating Union.

Skaters competed in the disciplines of men's and ladies' singles on the senior, junior levels and ice dancing on the senior levels for the title of national champion of South Korea. (Skaters in Novice Levels competed at Novice Championship in November 2013) The results of the national championships were used to choose the Korean teams to the 2014 World Figure Skating Championships.

The competition was held between 3 and 5 January 2014 at the Seongsa Ice Rink in Goyang.

Senior results

Men

Ladies

Ice dancing

Junior results

Junior men

Junior ladies

External links
2014 South Korean Figure Skating Championships 
 1st Day Results: Dance senior SD, Ladies junior SP, Men junior SP, Men senior SP
 2nd Day Results: Ladies junior FS, Ladies senior SP, Men junior FS
 3rd Day Results:  Dance senior FD, Ladies senior FS, Men senior FS

South Korean Figure Skating Championships
South Korean Figure Skating Championships, 2014
Figure skating
January 2014 sports events in South Korea